Harqin may refer to:

Harqin Banner, in  Inner Mongolia, China
Harqin Left Mongol Autonomous County, in Liaoning, China